Lorraine McIntosh (born 13 May 1964) is a Scottish singer, vocalist with Scottish band Deacon Blue, and actress.

Career
McIntosh is a vocalist with Deacon Blue, whose second studio album, When the World Knows Your Name (1989), topped the UK Album Charts for two weeks, and included "Real Gone Kid", which became their first UK top ten single.

McIntosh took a break from music to play the character Alice Henderson in the Scottish soap opera River City, which was set in a fictitious suburb of Glasgow. Her character first appeared in 2002 and was written out during May 2010.

McIntosh has also appeared in a few Scottish films, including Ken Loach's My Name Is Joe and Lone Scherfig's Wilbur Wants to Kill Himself, as well as in three episodes of the TV police-drama series, Taggart. She also starred in BBC One's comedy-drama, Hope Springs.

In 2017, McIntosh made a guest appearance in an episode of the fourth series of Scottish comedy series, Scot Squad.

Personal life
McIntosh is married to Deacon Blue lead singer Ricky Ross and they have four children. She is of maternal Irish Catholic descent, her mother is from Gweedore, County Donegal.

Discography

 Raintown (1987)
 When the World Knows Your Name (1989)
 Fellow Hoodlums (1991)
 Whatever You Say, Say Nothing (1993)
 Walking Back Home (1999) 
 Homesick (2001)
 The Hipsters (2012)
 A New House (2014)
 Believers (2016)
 City of Love (2020)
 Riding on the Tide of Love (2021)

Filmography
 My Name Is Joe - Maggie (1998)
 Hope Springs - Ina Harries (2009)
 River City - Alice Henderson (2002–2010)
 Taggart - Sharon Nash (2007)
 Scot Squad - Barbara Edwards (2017, 1 episode)
 Long Night at Blackstone (2018)

References

1964 births
Living people
21st-century Scottish women singers
People from Bridgeton, Glasgow
Scottish people of Irish descent
Scottish pop singers
Scottish television actresses
Scottish film actresses
Scottish soap opera actresses
Actresses from Glasgow
People from Cumnock
Musicians from Glasgow
Deacon Blue members
Scottish Roman Catholics
20th-century Scottish women singers